Péter Kovács (born in 1959, Szeged, Hungary) is a Hungarian professor of international law at the Peter Pazmany Catholic University, where he is the head of the Public International Law Department and the Doctoral School. Kovács has been a judge at the Constitutional Court of Hungary since 2005. Previously he served as a diplomat at the Embassy of Hungary in Paris and as the head of the Department for Human Rights and Minority Protection in the Hungarian Ministry of Foreign Affairs. Kovács was elected as a judge on the International Criminal Court in the 2014 election of judges by the Assembly of State Parties.

Kovács graduated from the Faculty of Law of József Attila University in 1983. After his studies at the European University Centre in Nancy, France, in 1983/84, he received his law degree specialized in community rights. For Kovács' thesis Protection of fundamental rights in the community rights system, 1987, he was awarded the title of “doctor universitatis” at the University of Miskolc, accredited as a Ph.D. degree in 1996. He qualified as a university lecturer in 1997. From 1983 he was senior lecturer, from 1998 university professor, between 1999 and 2005 head of Department for International Law at Miskolc. Kovács was granted full professorship, and between 1997 and 2005 he was head of Department at Peter Pazmany.

Between 1990 and 1994, Kovács worked at the Embassy of the Republic of Hungary to Paris, within the staff of the Ministry of Foreign Affairs, while in 1998/99 he was head of Department for Human Rights and Minority Law. In his quality of governmental expert, he took part in the elaboration of two conventions on the protection of minorities, concluded under the auspices of the Council of Europe, namely the European Charter for Regional or Minority Languages and the Framework-convention for the Protection of National Minorities in Europe.

As a visiting professor, Kovács gave lectures at several universities in France: University of Montpellier (one month in 2000), Paris-Sud (one month in 2002), Panthéon-Assas (one month in 2003), University of Nantes (one month in 2003); as well as in the United States (six months in 2002, Denver, Fulbright scholarship). He is a member of the Société Française pour le Droit International.

References

1959 births
Living people
Hungarian legal scholars
International Criminal Court judges
Hungarian judges
Hungarian diplomats
Hungarian judges of international courts and tribunals
Constitutional Court of Hungary judges
Fulbright alumni